Gonbad-e Qabus or Gonbad-e Qabus Tower is a monument in Gonbad-e Qabus, Iran, and a UNESCO World Heritage Site since 2012. It marks the grave of Ziyarid ruler Qabus (978–1012), and was built during his lifetime in 1006/7. The eponymous city is named after the monument.

Considered to be a masterpiece of Iranian architecture, according to Oleg Grabar, it achieves an "almost perfect balance between a purpose (princely glory beyond death), a form (cylindrical tower transformed into a star), and a single material (brick)". The Gonbad-e Qabus tower is the best known tower tomb in northern Iran and was featured in many publications.

Construction, plan and design
The inscription bands on the tower, written in rhymed prose, state that Qabus ordered the foundation of the tower built during his lifetime, in 1006/7. He was a prince of the Ziyarid dynasty, which was based in the historic Tabaristan region of northern Iran. In the 11th century, this region was still undergoing conversion from Zoroastrianism to Islam.

The foundation date on the monument is given in two calendar styles: Iranian solar and Islamic lunar. According to Sheila S. Blair (2002), the building's entrance contains some of the earliest evidence of the development of the moqarnas structure (i.e. stalactite vaulting) in Iran. In terms of design, the Gonbad-e Qabus tower resembles other cylindrical tomb towers on Iran's Caspian Sea littoral. However, the Gonbad-e Qabus tower differs from other examples because of its "extraordinary height". Taking its conical roof into account, the tower measures c.  above ground; this is three times its exterior diameter. Sheila S. Blair notes:

Oleg Grabar (1975) wrote that the Gonbad-e Qabus tower "clearly belongs to the general category of a secular architecture for conspicuous consumption". While discussing the forms of the tower tombs of northern Iran (which includes the Gonbad-e Qabus tower), Grabar stated that they may be connected with Zoroastrian funerary structures. According to him, the link to Zoroastrian funerary structures is "strongly suggested". He cites as examples the use of the Persian solar calendar in the inscription on the Gonbad-e Qabus, as well as the occasional use of Middle Persian (Pahlavi) on the other tomb towers of northern Iran. According to Melanie Michailidis (2009), Zoroastrian influence is "manifestly present" in the tower tombs of northern Iran, and can be seen in their height, purpose, and forms. She argues that the towers were built by the Ziyarids and Bavandids to emulate "the lost princely mausolea of the Sasanians". 

Though the tower is meant to be Qabus's mausoleum, there is no body buried inside, similar to the other tomb towers of northern Iran. According to legend, Qabus was buried in a glass coffin, hanging from the roof by chains. Michailidis adds that the "failure of the excavators to find a body might seem to lend credence to this story". She explains that the towers were used in a syncretic fashion. Bodies were placed inside the tombs, but lifted off the ground, resting on a platform "composed of some impermeable material". As Tabaristan was still undergoing Islamization at the time, syncretism would be a logical explanation according to Michailidis. Qabus's tower meets numerous criteria for disposing of the dead in the Zoroastrian way, but it does not "obviously" fit the category of an "orthodox Zoroastrian way of disposing of the dead", nor does it match a "proper Muslim burial".

Gallery

See also
Aliabad Tower
Gonbad-e Sorkh, Maragheh
List of tallest structures built before the 20th century

Notes

References

Sources

External links
 

Buildings and structures completed in 1007
Towers completed in the 11th century
Buildings and structures in Golestan Province
World Heritage Sites in Iran
Decagonal buildings
Towers in Iran
Burial sites of the Ziyarid dynasty
Tourist attractions in Golestan Province
National works of Iran
2nd-millennium establishments in Iran